Antonio José de Sucre is one of the 12 municipalities (municipios) that makes up the Venezuelan state of Barinas and, according to the 2011 census by the National Institute of Statistics of Venezuela, the municipality has a population of 81,665. The town of Socopó is the shire town of the Antonio José de Sucre Municipality. The municipality is one of several in Venezuela named in honour of Venezuelan independence hero Antonio José de Sucre (the others include only his surname, as "Sucre Municipality").

Demographics
The Antonio José de Sucre Municipality, according to a 2007 population estimate by the National Institute of Statistics of Venezuela, has a population of 74,968 (up from 63,947 in 2000). This amounts to 9.9% of the state's population.

Government
The mayor of the Antonio José de Sucre Municipality is Salvador Guerrero, elected on October 31, 2004, with 46% of the vote.  He replaced Trino Hurtado shortly after the elections.  The municipality is divided into three parishes; Ticoporo, Andrés Bello, and Nicolás Pulido.

References

External links
antoniojosedesucre-barinas.gob.ve 

Municipalities of Barinas (state)